Busaiteen is a small town in northern Bahrain. It is located on Muharraq Island, just north of Muharraq City. The town is historically a Sunni-majority area, although in recent years some Shi’ite residents have started moving into Busaiteen however the number of them remains small.

Etymology
The town's name, "Busaiteen," pertains to the large number of orchards (Basātīn بساتين in Arabic) found in it.

Education
Busaiteen has to its credit the first school in Bahrain and in the entire Persian Gulf region, which is Al-Hidaya Al-Khalifia School.
The Medical University of Bahrain which is a fully owned constituent university of RCSI, opened its new campus in Busaiteen in September 2008. King Hamad University Hospital, established by a royal decree in 2010, is situated in Busaiteen. The hospital is to be joint managed by RCSI Bahrain.
It has also Sh. Khalifa Bin Salman Al-Khalifa Institute of Technology.

The Ministry of Education operates area schools. Boys schools in Busaiteen include Al-Busaiteen Primary Boys School, Al-Hidaya Al-Khalifa Secondary Boys School, and Al-Muharraq Technical Secondary Boys School. Girls schools in Busaiteen include Al-Busaiteen Primary Girls School and Al-Busaiteen Intermediate Girls School.

The French School of Bahrain is located in Busaiteen.

Sport

The town has 2 sport clubs:
 Bahrain Sport Club
 Busaiteen Sport Club

Notable People
Turki al-Binali, Sunni Islamic Scholar

References

Populated places in the Muharraq Governorate